Chigusa (written: ,  or  in hiragana) is a feminine Japanese given name. Notable people with the name include:

, Japanese voice actress
, Japanese painter
, Japanese professional wrestler
, Japanese actress
Chigusa Busujima, character in Yandere Simulator

Chigusa is also a Japanese surname. Notable people with the surname include:

, Japanese basketball player
, Japanese concubine of Emperor Meiji

Japanese feminine given names
Japanese-language surnames